Shaun Bruce (born 13 January 1991) is an Australian professional basketball player for the Sydney Kings of the National Basketball League (NBL). He began his NBL career in 2012 as a development player with the Cairns Taipans, before earning a full-time roster spot in 2013. In 2016, he moved south to join the Brisbane Bullets. After half a season with the Adelaide 36ers in 2019, he joined the Kings.

Early life and career
Born and raised in Horsham, Victoria, Bruce attended Horsham College where he graduated from in 2008. Two years earlier, as a 15 year old, Bruce began playing for the Horsham Hornets in the Big V Division Two, joining his brother Cameron at the club. He played four seasons for the Hornets which culminated in a 2009 season where he averaged 27.5 points in 23 games, and had two triple-doubles during the year.

In January 2010, Bruce moved to Ballarat and joined the Ballarat Nuggets of the SEABL D-League. Under the tutelage of Ballarat Basketball Association elite program manager Guy Molloy, Bruce impressed early on for the Nuggets which earned him elevation to the senior squad, the Ballarat Miners, in April 2010. He completed his first season with the Miners having played in 19 games while averaging 3.6 points, 1.6 rebounds and 2.1 assists per game.

In 2011, Bruce re-joined the Miners and completed his first full SEABL season, a season which culminated in him winning the SEABL East Golden Hands Award, which is calculated by adding a player's assists and steals and subtracting their turnovers. In 26 games for the club, he averaged 6.7 points, 1.7 rebounds and 4.8 assists per game.

In January 2012, Bruce had a three-day training stint with the Melbourne Tigers of the National Basketball League. He believed the experience was invaluable to his future development, and in his third season as Miner in 2012, the numbers demonstrated such development. In 28 games for Ballarat in 2012, he averaged 10.8 points, 3.0 rebounds and 5.5 assists per game.

Professional career

Cairns Taipans (2012–2016)

2012–13 season
As a result of his continued improvement in the SEABL, in August 2012, Bruce signed with the Cairns Taipans as a development player for the 2012–13 NBL season, joining the NBL ranks alongside his brother Aaron. Despite moving north to Cairns, in December 2012, Bruce recommitted to the Ballarat Miners for the 2013 SEABL season. During the 2012–13 season, Bruce managed to appear in 17 games for the Taipans while averaging 1.1 points per game. He subsequently won the inaugural Aron Baynes Award for Most Outstanding Athlete.

His stint with the Taipans paid dividends, as he was a dominant force for the Miners in 2013 as team captain. In 17 games for the club, he averaged career high numbers of 14.6 points, 3.4 rebounds and 6.8 assists per game. He did, however, miss eight games during the season with a torn quadriceps, denying him a chance to represent Australia on the international stage at the World University Games.

2013–14 season
In August 2013, Bruce was rewarded with a full-time contract by the Taipans for the 2013–14 season. He appeared in 21 of the team's 28 games in 2013–14, averaging 1.2 points 1.0 rebounds per game.

During the 2014 off-season, Bruce remained in Cairns and joined the Taipans' feeder team, the Cairns Marlins, for the 2014 Queensland Basketball League season. He appeared in all 17 games for the Marlins in 2014, averaging 17.2 points, 4.0 rebounds, 4.6 assists and 1.2 steals per game. He was subsequently named to the QBL All-League Team.

2014–15 season
Bruce was retained by the Taipans for the 2014–15 season and received a more prominent role. As the back-up point guard, he assisted starters Scottie Wilbekin and Cameron Gliddon, and on 31 December 2014, he recorded his first double-digit scoring game of his NBL career with 12 points against the Adelaide 36ers. After finishing outside the playoff picture in 2013–14, the Taipans stormed to minor premiers in 2014–15 with a 21–7 record, a club record. They went on to qualify for the Grand Final series where they faced the New Zealand Breakers. However, they were outclassed by the Breakers in the best-of-three series, losing in straight sets despite having home court advantage. While Bruce's play during the 2014–15 season did not garner too many highlights, he built a reputation as a steady role player who runs the offence and defends with aggression. He appeared in 31 of the team's 32 games during the season, averaging 3.7 points, 1.5 rebounds and 1.7 assists per game.

In July 2015, after returning from the Australian University Games tour of Asia, Bruce re-joined the Cairns Marlins for the rest of the 2015 QBL season. He played in the team's final six games of the season and averaged 13.8 points, 4.0 rebounds, 5.0 assists and 1.2 steals over that stretch.

2015–16 season
On 19 June 2015, Bruce re-signed with the Taipans for the 2015–16 season. Forced to be more of a scoring option in the weeks leading up to Christmas because of injuries to teammates Markel Starks and Stephen Weigh, Bruce delivered when his team relied on him the most. Between 17 December and 6 January, he had four straight games with 10 or more points, including two straight with 17-point performances. His game against the Sydney Kings of 2 January produced 17 points and 8 rebounds. The Taipans dropped to sixth place in 2015–16 with a 12–16 record. Bruce appeared in all 28 games for the club, averaging 5.9 points, 2.0 rebounds and 1.9 assists per game.

On 22 March 2016, Bruce signed with the Mackay Meteors for the 2016 QBL season. He was named QBL Player of the Week for Round 6, thus garnering his first career player of the week award. He appeared in all 18 games for the Meteors in 2016, averaging 20.1 points, 5.2 rebounds, 6.2 assists and 1.1 steals per game. He was subsequently named to the QBL All-League Team for the second time in three years.

Brisbane Bullets (2016–2018)

2016–17 season
On 29 April 2016, Bruce signed a two-year deal with the Brisbane Bullets. He made his debut for the Bullets in their season opener on 6 October 2016, scoring eight points off the bench in a 72–65 win over the Perth Wildcats. He helped the Bullets start the season 2–0 with a 12-point effort off the bench against the Sydney Kings two days later. On 24 November 2016, he had a second 12-point effort in a 101–83 loss to the Adelaide 36ers. On 27 January 2017, he scored a season-high 13 points in an 80–77 loss to Melbourne United. Bruce finished the season averaging 10 points per game over the final seven contests, as the Bullets concluded their first season back in the NBL in last place with a 10–18 record. He appeared in all 28 games for the Bullets in 2016–17, averaging 5.9 points, 1.7 rebounds and 2.3 assists per game.

QBL MVP (2017)
On 23 February 2017, Bruce re-signed with the Mackay Meteors for the 2017 QBL season. On 13 May 2017, he recorded a triple-double with 22 points, 13 rebounds and 12 assists in a 99–86 win over the Townsville Heat. On 10 June 2017, he recorded his second triple-double of the season with 23 points, 11 rebounds and 13 assists in a 113–93 win over the Brisbane Spartans. He was subsequently named Player of the Week for Round 7. On 2 July 2017, he scored 34 points in a 103–85 win over the Cairns Marlins. On 29 July 2017, he recorded 15 points and a season-high 21 assists in a 115–104 overtime win over the Sunshine Coast Phoenix. He was subsequently named Player of the Week for Round 14. He helped the Meteors finish the regular season in second place with a 14–3 record. The Meteors went on to reach the 2017 QBL Grand Final series, but they were defeated 2–1 by the Townsville Heat after Bruce went down with an ankle injury in Game 1. He was subsequently named the Most Valuable Player of the QBL for the 2017 season. In 19 games for the Meteors, he averaged 22.6 points, 5.9 rebounds, 9.5 assists and 1.2 steals per game.

2017–18 season
In the wake of his ankle injury with the Meteors, initial fears were that Bruce had possibly broken his ankle, but scans revealed only ligament damage. He subsequently missed all of September, thus sitting out Bullets' preseason games and ultimately their season opener in early October. Bruce returned from the ankle injury for the Bullets against the NBA's Phoenix Suns in mid-October during Brisbane's trip to the United States to feature in an official NBA pre-season clash. On 28 October 2017, Bruce scored a season-high 13 points in an 87–85 win over Melbourne United. The Bullets finished the 2017–18 season in last place with a 9–19 record. In 27 games, Bruce averaged 3.0 points, 1.2 rebounds and 1.3 assists per game.

Wellington Saints (2018)
On 20 April 2018, Bruce signed with the Wellington Saints for the 2018 New Zealand NBL season. In his debut for the Saints a week later, Bruce scored 16 points off the bench in a 113–108 loss to the Southland Sharks. On 3 July, he scored a season-high 21 points in a 94–92 win over the Canterbury Rams. He helped the Saints win the minor premiership with a 15–3 record, before they went on to lose 98–96 to the Sharks in the grand final. He appeared in all 20 games for the Saints in 2018, averaging 10.9 points, 4.2 rebounds, 2.5 assists and 1.1 steals per game.

Westports Malaysia Dragons (2018)
On 23 November 2018, Bruce played one game as a stand-in import for the Westports Malaysia Dragons of the ASEAN Basketball League.

Adelaide 36ers and Rockhampton Rockets (2019)
On 16 January 2019, Bruce signed a short-term contract with the Adelaide 36ers as a replacement for injured import Ramone Moore. In seven games, he averaged 2.4 points per game.

In April 2019, Bruce joined the Rockhampton Rockets for the 2019 QBL season. In 20 games, he averaged 22.0 points, 4.8 rebounds, 9.6 assists and 1.8 steals per game.

Sydney Kings and Logan Thunder (2019–present)
On 26 April 2019, Bruce signed a one-year deal with the Sydney Kings. He played a key role off the bench for the Kings in 2019–20, averaging career highs while stepping up in the absence of the injured Kevin Lisch. He helped the Kings finish as minor premiers with a 20–8 record before going on to help them reach the 2020 NBL Grand Final series, where they lost 2–1 to the Perth Wildcats. He appeared in all 34 games, averaging 7.1 points, 1.4 rebounds and 3.0 assists per game.

On 15 June 2020, Bruce re-signed with the Kings on a two-year deal. In February 2021, he played his 200th NBL game.

Bruce joined the Logan Thunder for the 2021 NBL1 North season.

In May 2022, Bruce played his 250th NBL game and played in his third NBL Grand Final series. He helped the Kings win the 2021–22 NBL championship.

On 23 May 2022, Bruce re-signed with the Kings on a two-year deal.

Bruce is set to re-join the Logan Thunder for the 2023 NBL1 North season.

Personal life
Bruce is the son of Steve and Julie Bruce. His mother was a national-level swimmer, while two of his uncles, Des and Stephen Ryan, played in the Australian Football League (AFL). He also has two older brothers, Aaron and Cameron. Aaron formerly played in the NBL, while Cameron has played many years in the lower level Victorian basketball divisions.

Bruce is close friends with AFL player Jake Lloyd.

References

External links
Shaun Bruce at brisbanebullets.com
Shaun Bruce NBL stats at sportstg.com
Shaun Bruce 2017 QBL stats at sportstg.com

1991 births
Living people
Adelaide 36ers players
Australian expatriate basketball people in Malaysia
Australian expatriate basketball people in New Zealand
Australian men's basketball players
Brisbane Bullets players
Cairns Taipans players
Point guards
Shooting guards
Sydney Kings players
Wellington Saints players
Kuala Lumpur Dragons players
People from Horsham, Victoria